Obliterator is a side-scrolling arcade adventure computer game published by Psygnosis in 1988. It was released for Amiga, Atari ST, ZX Spectrum, Amstrad CPC, and MS-DOS. The game was programmed by David H. Lawson and its graphics were made by Garvan Corbett and Jim Ray Bowers. The soundtrack was composed by David Whittaker and the cover art is by the artist Roger Dean.

Plot
The game begins when the main character Drak is teleported into the alien spaceship that is approaching the earth. The objective of the game is to destroy the spaceship by finding certain objects from the ship. When the self-destruction is active, Drak has to find an escape shuttle before the spaceship blows up in order to survive.

Gameplay

The control method is identical to that of Barbarian which was published the previous year.

Reception
Obliterator was reviewed in Computer Gaming World as a fun, well-executed action game, albeit not a challenging one. The game was praised for using score not just as an arbitrary value, but also to determine the time left for the hero to escape.

C-lehti (3/1988)  gave five stars for Amiga version and also full ten points for its music, graphics, interest-factor and "atmosphere". The review says that the game shows that the Amiga computer is capable of delivering what users have been awaiting, using computer's capabilities in a way that makes gaming experience a visual enjoyment. The review notes that the game is relatively easy to finish but still leaves a feeling that the game was worthy of its price. A possibility to save a game state on a disk is seen as an improvement to the previous game, Barbarian, from the authors.

References

External links
Obliterator at Atari Mania
Obliterator at Lemon Amiga

1988 video games
Action-adventure games
Amiga games
Amstrad CPC games
Atari ST games
DOS games
Psygnosis games
Run and gun games
Video games scored by David Whittaker
ZX Spectrum games
Video games developed in the United Kingdom